Robert Hall Baker, Sr., (June 27, 1839 – October 5, 1882) was an American businessman and politician.  He served three years in the Wisconsin State Senate (1873, 1875, 1876), one year as Mayor of Racine, Wisconsin (1874), and was Chairman of the Republican Party of Wisconsin. In business, he was one of the four principal owners of the J.I. Case Company.

Biography
Born in Geneva, Walworth County, Wisconsin Territory, to Martha Washington Larrabee and Charles Minton Baker. His father was a lawyer, judge, and politician. Baker attended Beloit College and assisted his father's law practice in Lake Geneva before moving to Racine.

Robert married Emily M. Carswell in 1859 and they had five children.  They resided in Racine at the corner of 6th and Main Street, now the site of the U.S. Post Office.

In 1856, he entered business in Racine hardware supply, then worked for one year with Thomas Falvey, a reaper manufacturer.  He then went to work for the J.I. Case Company in 1860 as a collecting agent.

In January 1863, Baker purchased a one quarter stake in the J.I. Case Company, becoming one of the four major shareholders in the company, the others being M.B. Erskine, Stephen Bull, and Jerome Case himself.

In Racine, Baker was elected as school commissioner in 1867, alderman in 1868 and 1871, and mayor in 1874. He won election to the Wisconsin Senate in 1872, defeating Democrat Nicholas D. Fratt. In 1873, he was the Republican candidate for Lieutenant Governor of Wisconsin, losing to Charles D. Parker. In 1874 he was elected to return to the Senate, defeating incumbent Liberal Republican Charles Herrick.  Baker was chairman of the Republican Party of Wisconsin during the presidential campaign of James Garfield, and was appointed government director of the Union Pacific Railroad by Garfield after he became president. He held this office until his death in 1882.

He was a director of the Racine Hardware Manufacturing Company, a director of the Manufacturers National Bank of Racine and the National Iron Company of De Pere, Wisconsin, and president of the Hampton Coal Mining Company.

Electoral history

Wisconsin Senate (1872)

Wisconsin Lieutenant Governor (1873)

Wisconsin Senate (1874)

References

 
 
 

People from Lake Geneva, Wisconsin
Beloit College alumni
Businesspeople from Racine, Wisconsin
Mayors of Racine, Wisconsin
Republican Party of Wisconsin chairs
Wisconsin city council members
Republican Party Wisconsin state senators
1839 births
1882 deaths
19th-century American politicians
19th-century American businesspeople